Kevin Dresser (November 9, 1962) is a collegiate wrestling coach, currently at Iowa State University and formerly at Virginia Tech (2006-2017). Dresser had also been a coach at Christiansburg HS, Grundy HS, and an assistant at the University of Iowa, after having wrestled for the Hawkeyes.

Early life 

Born in Fort Dodge and a native of Humboldt, Iowa, Dresser was a two-time high school wrestling state champion and four time place winner fifth (freshman) and sixth (sophomore) at Humboldt High School. Kevin had a high school record of 112-11-1, he holds his school's records for number of takedowns and pins.  Kevin matriculated to the University of Iowa where he was an NCAA National Champion at 142 pounds in 1986. He was also a two-time NCAA All-American and two-time Big Ten Conference Champion. Kevin had an NCAA record of 34-2-1 with 16 falls.  His coach at Iowa was wrestling legend Dan Gable. In 1986, he was given the Mike Howard Award as the most valuable wrestler for the Hawkeyes that season.

Early coaching career 

Dresser coached under Dan Gable at Iowa for several years after graduation.  He then accepted a position as head wrestling coach at Grundy High School in Grundy, VA. Dresser led the Virginia powerhouse to eight Virginia state titles in eight years.  Dresser then moved to Christiansburg, Virginia to take over the wrestling program at Christiansburg High School.  He successfully built the team from scratch and led them to 5 consecutive Virginia state team championships. During his tenure, Christiansburg High School was ranked as high as fourth in the nation.

Collegiate coaching career

Virginia Tech

Kevin Dresser took over as head coach for the Virginia Tech Hokies wrestling team in 2006, upon the departure of Tom Brands.

Dresser went 160-51 in 11 seasons. The team earned two ACC Tournament Championships (2012–13 and 2013–14) and three ACC Dual Championships (2014–15, 2015–16, and 2016–17), during his tenure.

Kevin was named the 2016 NWCA Coach of the Year.

Iowa State

Nearing the end of the 2016-17 season, Kevin Dresser accepted an offer to be the new head coach of wrestling at Iowa State University. Bringing with him his wife Penny, oldest daughter Emma, middle daughter Anna, and youngest son, Jack.  He signed a 7-year, $2.25 million contract.

References

External links

1962 births
Living people
Iowa State Cyclones wrestling coaches
People from Humboldt, Iowa
American male sport wrestlers
Sportspeople from Fort Dodge, Iowa